Meppelink is a Dutch surname. Notable people with the surname include:

Madelein Meppelink (born 1989), Dutch beach volleyball player
Rob Meppelink (born 1966), Dutch footballer and manager

Dutch-language surnames